North Wiltshire was a non-metropolitan district in Wiltshire, England. It was abolished on 1 April 2009 and replaced by Wiltshire Council.

Political control
From the first election to the council in 1973 until its abolition in 2009, political control of the council was held by the following parties:

Leadership
The leaders of the council from 2003 until the council's abolition in 2009 were:

Council elections
1973 North Wiltshire District Council election
1976 North Wiltshire District Council election
1979 North Wiltshire District Council election
1983 North Wiltshire District Council election (New ward boundaries, district boundary changes)
1987 North Wiltshire District Council election
1991 North Wiltshire District Council election, (District boundary changes took place but the number of seats remained the same)
1995 North Wiltshire District Council election
1999 North Wiltshire District Council election
2003 North Wiltshire District Council election (New ward boundaries)
2007 North Wiltshire District Council election (New ward boundaries)

By-election results

References

 
Council elections in Wiltshire
District council elections in England